Vera and the Olga are two historic rowhouse blocks located at Indianapolis, Indiana.  They were built in 1901, and are two-story, ten unit, red brick rows on a courtyard. Each building has a hipped roof and each unit is three bays wide.  The buildings feature projecting bay windows and front porches.

It was listed on the National Register of Historic Places in 1984.

References

Houses on the National Register of Historic Places in Indiana
Houses completed in 1901
Houses in Indianapolis
National Register of Historic Places in Indianapolis